The Limón Group is a geologic group in Costa Rica. It preserves fossils dating back to the Late Miocene to Early Pleistocene period.

Stratigraphy 
The Limón Group is subdivided into:
 Moin Formation
 Río Banano Formation
 Uscari Formation
 Quebrada Chocolate Formation

See also 

 List of fossiliferous stratigraphic units in Costa Rica

References 

Geologic groups of North America
Limon
Neogene Costa Rica
Pleistocene Costa Rica
Siltstone formations
Sandstone formations
Shale formations
Mudstone formations
Limestone formations
Reef deposits
Shallow marine deposits
Deltaic deposits
Formations